Newtonburg is an unincorporated community located in the town of Newton, Manitowoc County, Wisconsin, United States.
It is a community to the west of the intersection of WIS 42 and English Lake Road. St. John's Lutheran Church, founded 1851 and built in 1922, is the focal point of the community.

Notes

Unincorporated communities in Manitowoc County, Wisconsin
Unincorporated communities in Wisconsin